Peace & Prosperity (Chinese: 富贵平安) ran for 170 episodes series produced by Mediacorp Channel 8. It stars Xiang Yun, Desmond Tan, Belinda Lee, Tong Bingyu,  Dawn Yeoh, Tracy Lee, Julie Tan, Michelle Wong and Zhang Wei as the casts in this series.

The show replaced the second half of the 7.00 pm drama timeslot, airing weekdays from April 4, 2016, 7.30 pm to 8.00 pm on weekdays making it the 3rd long form half hour drama airing together with news-current affairs programme Hello Singapore at 6.30pm.

Plot
Peace and Prosperity is centered around the lives of the Huang family who have been running a TCM (traditional Chinese medicine) clinic for three generations. The family-run business is on the search for its next successor as the young generation of Huangs are not interested in TCM and have yet to prove themselves capable of running the business.
The clinic was founded by Huang Datong's (Zhang Wei) father and is now operated by his daughter-in-law Shen Ping'an (Xiang Yun), who is also caring for six daughters; Huang Ziting (Belinda Lee), Huang Zishan (Tong Bingyu), Huang Zijun (Dawn Yeoh), Huang Ziyu (Tracy Lee), Huang Zihong (Julie Tan) and Huang Zixin (Michelle Wong).

Shen Ping'an's vast knowledge in Chinese medicine is well known in the neighbourhood and many people show up at the hall for her medical consultation. Huang Datong's elder son, Huang Yuanhao (Marcus Chin) and his wife Lin Shuzhi (Lin Meijiao) open a fruit stall near "Prosperity Hall", idling their days away. The only thing that motivates them is plotting Shen Ping'an's downfall so that they can get a share of ‘Prosperity Hall" for themselves. They are constantly creating trouble and distrust within the family. They have a son named Huang Zihao (Shane Pow) who is a lazy and spoilt young man. Datong does not trust them to take over "Prosperity Hall" and decides to let Ping An manage the hall. Datong is still bothered by the choice of possible successor to Ping An.

Hong Yingxiong (Desmond Tan) sponsors Yingxiong's study in traditional Chinese medicine and hopes of having him as a grandson-in-law and subsequently, his successor. Hong Yingxiong is in love with Huang Zihong but Zihong went to New York and came back with Lan Baojie (Romeo Tan); as he still has not given up on Zihong, the show is left in a cliffhanger.

Cast

Main cast
 Huang Family

Hong Family

Yeo Family

Xiao Family 

Beautiful Story

Ouyang Family

Ho & Huang Clinic

Other Cast

Cameo Appearances

Other Casts

Wind Asia

Deceased but mentioned

Original Sound Track (OST)

Marketing
 The first promotional roadshow was held at Bugis+, Civic Plaza. Artistes Xiang Yun, Desmond Tan, Julie Tan, Belinda Lee, Tong Bing Yu, Dawn Yeoh, Michelle Wong, Marcus Chin, Lin Meijiao, Terence Cao, Yao Wenlong, Ben Yeo, Jeffrey Xu, Seraph Sun, Jayley Woo and Priscelia Chan were present.
A neighbourhood walk was conducted with artistes Zhang Wei, Xiang Yun, Desmond Tan, Romeo Tan, Tracy Lee, Dawn Yeoh, Michelle Wong, Marcus Chin, Lin Meijiao, Ben Yeo, Jeffrey Xu, Seraph Sun and Jayley Woo present.

Awards & Nominations

Star Awards 2017
Peace & Prosperity  was nominated for 3 Awards at Star Awards 2017, winning one.

References

Singapore Chinese dramas
2016 Singaporean television series debuts
2016 Singaporean television series endings
Channel 8 (Singapore) original programming